Luis Antonio González Roldán (born 26 February 1967) is a Mexican politician affiliated with the PANAL. As of 2013 he served as Deputy of both the LIX and LXII Legislatures of the Mexican Congress representing the State of Mexico.

References

1967 births
Living people
People from Mexico City
New Alliance Party (Mexico) politicians
21st-century Mexican politicians
Deputies of the LXII Legislature of Mexico
Members of the Chamber of Deputies (Mexico) for the State of Mexico